Town Haul is a television program on TLC, hosted by Genevieve Gorder. It makes-over old (small) towns to give them a new look. Its first town was Jeffersonville, New York. Its second town was Laurens, South Carolina. In the first two seasons, they typically made over family-run businesses.  In the third season, set in the town of Washington, Missouri, the first rebuild was of a house, but the second was of a historic, family owned business known for its mile high pies.

References

External links
 

TLC (TV network) original programming
2000s American reality television series
2005 American television series debuts
2005 American television series endings
Home renovation television series
Television shows set in Missouri
Television shows set in New York (state)
Television shows set in South Carolina